Colchicum baytopiorum is a plant species native to western Turkey and to the Greek island of Rhodes (although possibly extinct there).  It has small, bright pink-purple flowers measuring 4 cm (1.5") across.  It is unusual in the genus in producing small leaves in autumn while in bloom, as opposed to producing leaves in spring.  It has a chromosome number of 46, 54 or 108.  The species was named in honor of Turkish botanist Asuman Baytop.

References

baytopiorum
Flora of Turkey
Flora of Greece
Rhodes
Plants described in 1983